TRB may refer to:

 Tom Robinson Band, a British rock band
 Funnelbeaker culture (Trichterbecherkultur in German), a megalithic culture
 Transportation Research Board, a U.S. advisory board
 Terminating Reliable Broadcast, in distributed computing
 TRB (writer), a ghostwriter name used in The New Republic magazine
 The firearm technique  "tap, rack, bang"
 trb., a musical abbreviation for trombone